Pelargonium littorale is a species of Pelargonium found within the southwest botanical province of Australia.

Description 
A perennial herb found as an erect or semiprostrate shrub, Pelargonium littorale may be 100 to 500 mm in height. The flowers are pink with a deeper coloration at the center.
The species bears a strong resemblance to a co-genor, Pelargonium capitatum; a 'rose scented' species, introduced from South Africa, that occupies a very similar habitat.
The species was first described by Karl von Hügel, a plant collector who visited the state in 1837.  This was published by Endlicher.
It is described as native, not endemic.

Distribution
The plant is found along coastal regions in the province, the range extends from most south eastern corner to the Geraldton Sandplains in the North. An occurrence is also given in South Australia and Victoria.

Taxonomy 
The species has been placed within Pelargonium sect. Peristera. 
A subspecies division has also been applied :
 Pelargonium littorale Huegel subsp. littorale

References 

littorale
Geraniales of Australia
Rosids of Western Australia
Flora of South Australia
Flora of Victoria (Australia)